Sharon E. Barker (born 1949) is a Canadian-American women's rights activist, women's health advocate, and feminist. She is the founding director of the Women's Resource Center at the University of Maine and one of the founders and first president of the Mabel Sine Wadsworth Women's Health Center in Bangor. For over 30 years she has advocated for women and girls in the areas of health care, gender equality, sexual assault, and reproductive rights. She was inducted into the Maine Women's Hall of Fame in 2009.

Early life and education
Sharon Barker was born in New Brunswick, Canada. She has two sisters. At the age of 8 she moved with her family to Fort Fairfield, Maine. In seventh grade she befriended Ruth Lockhart, with whom she would co-found the Mabel Sine Wadsworth Women's Health Center. She earned her bachelor's degree in psychology and master's degree in public administration at the University of Maine.

Career

After graduation, Barker helped manage the Community House, an adult-education program in Fort Fairfield, and worked briefly as a taxi driver. She then worked for ten years as a family planning counselor and coordinator for Penquis CAP in Bangor. In 1984 she, Lockhart, and three other activists founded the Mabel Sine Wadsworth Women's Health Center as a private, non-profit center that would provide abortion services and lesbian health care. Barker was the center's first president.

In 1991 Barker was named director of the new Women's Resource Center at the University of Maine, which provides information and advocacy for students. She filled the position on a part-time basis until 1999, when her salary was ensured by a grant. Among the initiatives she has overseen are the Safe Campus project against sexual assault, the United Sisters mentoring program pairing college women with high-school girls, the Girls' Collaborative Project, $tart $mart salary negotiation workshops, and the annual "Expanding Your Horizons" conference that brings 500 middle school girls to campus to explore career opportunities in the STEM fields. Barker is also a frequent speaker and workshop presenter on health care, gender equality, and women's rights.

Memberships
Barker has been a member of numerous state nonprofit boards and committees, including the Penobscot Valley American Association of University Women, Maine Women's Fund, Eastern Regional Commission for Women, Good Samaritan Agency, Bangor CUReS Project, Bangor Rape Crisis Center, Women's Business Development Corporation, the Komen Foundation, and the Maine Jobs Council. She was appointed to Rep. John Baldacci's Advisory Committee on Juvenile Crime, Domestic Violence, Drug Abuse and Hate Crimes. In 1995 she was named to a panel that developed ideas to reduce the threat of violence at state abortion clinics. She established the Maine chapter of the National Abortion Rights Action League.

Awards and honors
Barker received the Mary Hatwood Futrell Award from the National Education Association in 1997. She is also the recipient of the Mabel Sine Wadsworth Women's Health Achievement Award (1997), the Woman of the Year citation from the Bangor and Maine Federation of Business and Professional Women (1999), and the Sarah Orne Jewett Award (2004), recognizing lifetime achievement in advocating for women and girls in the areas of "health care, poverty, sexual assault, juvenile justice, gender equity, education and peace", from the Maine Women's Fund. She was inducted into the Maine Women's Hall of Fame in 2009.

Personal life
Barker and her partner, John Hoyt, have two sons.

References

1949 births
American women's rights activists
American feminists
University of Maine alumni
People from Bangor, Maine
People from Fort Fairfield, Maine
Activists from New Brunswick
Canadian emigrants to the United States
Living people